A double tap is a shooting technique where two shots are fired in rapid succession at the same target with the same sight picture (as opposed to the controlled pair, whereby a second sighting is acquired for the second shot). Instruction and practice of the double-tap improves accuracy as shooters often do not have the gun fully extended on the first shot meaning the second of a double-tap is usually the better. The term hammer is sometimes used to describe a double tap in which the firearm's sights are not reacquired by the shooter between shots.

History 
The origin of the double tap technique is credited to William Ewart Fairbairn and Eric A. Sykes, British police chiefs working in Shanghai during the 1930s who developed the technique in order to overcome the limitations of full metal jacketed (FMJ) ammunition. FMJ ammunition is commonly used by militaries for feeding reliability, adherence to the Hague Conventions regarding non-expanding ammunition, and improved penetration. FMJ rounds can sometimes fail to cause sufficient damage (at least when compared to expanding bullets), requiring more hits and better shot placement. In Ian Dear’s book Sabotage and Subversion about British Special Operations Executive (SOE) and United States Office of Strategic Services (OSS) forces, Fairbairn is reported to have instructed SOE personnel in the double tap from 1944 to 1945 at the SOE training school directed by Fairbairn and Sykes near Arisaig in Scotland. The term double tap is now used to describe the more general technique of firing two rounds quickly and accurately to disable an opponent. The tactic is still used by firearms handlers, police tactical teams, military personnel, counter-terrorist combat units, and other special operations forces personnel.

The Russian assault rifle AN-94 can automatically shoot two bullets in a rapid burst; this feature was intended to improve the single shot hit probability of the rifle.

Double taps are an integral part of the El Presidente combat pistol shooting drill developed by Jeff Cooper during the 1970s and published in the January/February 1979 issue of American Handgunner. Also developed by Cooper during the 1970s is the Mozambique Drill or Failure Drill, for a situation whereby a double-tap to the torso fails to stop an attacker, adding a third shot to the head.

Technique 
In the double-tap technique, after the first round is fired, the shooter quickly reacquires the sights for a fast second shot. This skill can be practiced by firing two shots at a time, taking time between the shots to reacquire the sights. With practice, the time between shots becomes briefer and briefer until it seems to an observer as if the shooter is just pulling the trigger twice very quickly.

According to a U.S. Army training manual, "There is a natural arc of the front sight post after the round is fired and the recoil kicks in. The soldier lets the barrel go with this arc and immediately brings the front sight post back on target and takes a second shot. The soldier does not fight the recoil. In combat, soldiers shoot until the enemy goes down. For multiple targets, each target should receive a double tap. After all targets are engaged, soldiers engage the targets again as needed."

Double tap strike 
The term has also been used more recently to refer to the practice of following a strike, e.g., a missile, air strikes, artillery shelling or improvised explosive device attack with a second strike several minutes later, hitting response teams, helpers, and medics rushing to the site.

Double-tap strikes have been used by Saudi Arabia during its military intervention in Yemen, by the United States in Pakistan and Yemen, and the Russian and Syrian governments in the Syrian civil war.

The Bureau of Investigative Journalism reports that from June 2004 through mid-September 2012, available data indicate that drone strikes killed 2,562–3,325 people in Pakistan, of whom 474–881 were civilians and 176 were children, and injured an additional 1,228–1,362 individuals. Human Rights Watch reports two of the six drone attacks performed by the United States in Yemen from 2009 to 2013 violated the laws of war "because they struck only civilians or used indiscriminate weapons".

See also 
 AN-94
 Modern technique (shooting)
 Point shooting
 Stopping power

References 

Law enforcement techniques
Firearm techniques
Obama administration controversies